The Laurentian Channel is a deep submarine valley off the coast of eastern Canada in the Gulf of Saint Lawrence.

The channel is of glacial origin and is the submerged valley of the historic Saint Lawrence River, running  from a sharp escarpment downstream from the confluence of the St. Lawrence with the Saguenay River, past Anticosti Island and through the Gulf of St. Lawrence to the edge of the continental shelf off the island of Newfoundland.

Deep waters with temperatures between  enter the Gulf at the continental slope and are slowly advected up the channel by estuariane circulation. Over the 20th century, the bottom waters of the end of the channel (i.e. in the Saint Lawrence estuary) have become hypoxic.

Ecological importance
The Laurentian Channel is an ecologically important area, providing critical habitat for a variety of marine species, some of which are fished commercially and others that are not. Non-commercial species are part of the marine ecosystem in the area. The Laurentian Channel contains the highest concentration of black dogfish in Canadian waters and is the only place where pupping occurs. It is an important spawning, nursery, and feeding area for a variety of species including porbeagle shark and smooth skate. Porbeagle sharks and basking sharks move into the area in the spring and reside there throughout the summer. One of only two known porbeagle shark mating grounds occurs within the channel. Two species at risk, the northern wolffish and the leatherback sea turtle, have been found in the area. In addition, at least 20 species of whales and dolphins have been observed in the area, as it is a critical feeding area and migration route into and out of the Gulf of St. Lawrence.

The Laurentian Channel contains significant coral and sea pen populations, representing sensitive benthic habitats. Coral and sea pens are important to the ecosystem and depend on the integrity of the sands and muds in the area for their survival. Of the variety of coral species found in the area, sea pens have been recorded in the greatest numbers and diversity, with the Laurentian Channel being described as having the highest sea pen concentrations within the entire Newfoundland and Labrador Shelves Bioregion.

Laurentian Channel Marine Protected Area
A portion of the Laurentian Channel was identified as an Ecologically and Biologically Significant Area (EBSA) in 2007. On June 8, 2010, the Minister of Fisheries and Oceans Canada announced the Laurentian Channel as an Area of Interest (AOI). In June 2017 Fisheries and Oceans Canada (DFO) has proposed the Laurentian Channel AOI as a Marine Protected Area (MPA) under the Oceans Act. In April 2019 Fisheries and Oceans Canada designated the Laurentian Channel Marine Protected Area (MPA).

The main purpose of the Laurentian Channel Marine Protected Area is to protect the biodiversity of the region. This MPA explicitly protects porbeagle sharks, smooth sakes, basking sharks, black dogfishes, northern wolffish, and leatherback sea turtles, along with sea pens and other cold water coral. Atlantic cod is not officially protected, the Laurentian Channel MPA could encompass a possible spawning ground. Much is still to be discovered regarding the life cycle of Atlantic cod which makes it a difficult species to protect using smaller, specific MPAs (SLOSS Debate). Thus, due to the large, undivided size of the Laurentian Channel MPA, the chance of protecting the region where Atlantic cod spawn is significantly higher.

See also
 Laurentian River System
 Cabot Strait
 1929 Grand Banks earthquake
 Laurentian Slope Seismic Zone

References

External links
 Will "Dead Zones" Spread in the St. Lawrence River? - Department of Fisheries and Oceans

Valleys of Canada
Marine Protected Areas of Canada